PK-103 North Waziristan-I is a constituency for the Khyber Pakhtunkhwa Assembly of the Khyber Pakhtunkhwa province of Pakistan.It was created in 2018 after merger of FATA with Khyber Pakhtunkhwa before 2019 elections. This constituency covers Eastern parts of  North Waziristan.

Members of Assembly

2019-2023: PK-111 North Waziristan-I

Election 2019 
After merger of FATA with Khyber Pakhtunkhwa provincial elections were held for the very first time. Pakistan Tehreek e Insaf candidate Muhammad Iqbal Wazir won the seat by getting 10,220 votes.

See also 

 PK-102 Bannu-IV
 PK-104 North Waziristan-II

References

External links 

 Khyber Pakhtunkhwa Assembly's official website
 Election Commission of Pakistan's official website
 Awaztoday.com Search Result
 Election Commission Pakistan Search Result

Khyber Pakhtunkhwa Assembly constituencies